The Dean of Blackburn is the head (primus inter pares – first among equals) and chair of the chapter of canons, which is the ruling body of Blackburn Cathedral.

The dean and chapter are based at the Cathedral Church of Blackburn St Mary the Virgin with St Paul in Blackburn. The post was designated as provost before September 2000, which was then the equivalent of dean at most English Cathedrals. The cathedral is the mother church of the Diocese of Blackburn and seat of the Bishop of Blackburn.

The incumbent dean is Peter Howell-Jones, who was installed on 25 March 2017.

List of Deans

Provosts
 1931–1936: John Sinker
 1936–1961: William Kay
 1961–1972: Norman Robinson
 1973–1992: Lawrence Jackson 
 December 1992 – September 2000: David Frayne (became Dean)

Deans
 September 2000 – September 2001: David Frayne (previously Provost)
 November 2001 – 17 June 2016 (res.): Christopher Armstrong
 June 2016March 2017 (acting): Philip North, Bishop Suffragan of Burnley
 25 March 2017present: Peter Howell-Jones

References

Deans of Blackburn
Deans of Blackburn
 
Deans of Blackburn
Lancashire-related lists